R514 road may refer to:
 R514 road (Ireland)
 R514 road (South Africa)